The Atlanta Flames were a professional ice hockey team based in Atlanta from 1972 until 1980. They played home games in the Omni Coliseum and were members of the West and later Patrick divisions of the National Hockey League (NHL). Along with the New York Islanders, the Flames were created in 1971 as part of the NHL's conflict with the rival World Hockey Association (WHA). The team enjoyed modest success on the ice, qualifying for the playoffs in six of its eight seasons, but failed to win a playoff series and won only two post-season games total. The franchise struggled to draw fans and, after averaging only 10,000 per game in the early years of 1979–80, was sold and relocated to Alberta to become the Calgary Flames.

Eric Vail was the Flames' top goal scorer with 174 while Tom Lysiak led with 431 points. Guy Chouinard was the lone player to score 50 goals in one season. Goaltender Dan Bouchard led the team in wins (166) and shutouts (20). Two Flames players won the Calder Memorial Trophy as the NHL's top rookie: Vail in 1974–75 and Willi Plett in 1975–76. Bob MacMillan won the Lady Byng Memorial Trophy as the most gentlemanly player in 1978–79. General manager Cliff Fletcher is the lone member of the Atlanta team to be named to the Hockey Hall of Fame.

History

Formation

The National Hockey League (NHL), which had grown from six teams in 1966 to fourteen in 1970, had not planned further expansion until at least 1973. However, the 1971 formation of a rival major league—the World Hockey Association (WHA)—altered the NHL's plans and resulted in the two leagues battling for players and markets. The NHL sought to keep the WHA out of the newly constructed Nassau Coliseum in Long Island, New York. The league also opted to place a team in the American South. The NHL announced on November 9, 1971, that it was expanding to Long Island and Atlanta. The Atlanta franchise was awarded to Tom Cousins, who also owned the Atlanta Hawks of the National Basketball Association (NBA), and would play out of the newly built Omni Coliseum. The team cost $6 million. Cousins named the franchise the Flames in homage to the burning of Atlanta by United States Army General William Sherman during the American Civil War.

The Flames hired Cliff Fletcher, formerly of the St. Louis Blues, to serve as the team's general manager. Former Montreal Canadiens player Bernie Geoffrion was hired as the team's head coach. The team stocked its roster via an expansion draft held on June 6, 1972. Fletcher focused on goaltending, choosing Phil Myre with his first selection and rookie Dan Bouchard with his second. Fletcher drafted a competent roster, but one that was young and inexperienced. Two days later, the Flames selected Jacques Richard as the second overall pick in the 1972 NHL Amateur Draft.

1972–1975
The Flames made their NHL debut in Long Island against their expansion cousins, the New York Islanders, on October 7, 1972. They won the game 3–2; Morris Stefaniw scored the first goal in franchise history and the first NHL goal in Nassau Veterans Memorial Coliseum. The team made its home debut one week later on October 14. Hosting the first event in Omni Coliseum history, the Flames tied the Buffalo Sabres, 1–1, before a sellout crowd of 14,568. The team was respectable through much of the season on the strength of Bouchard and Myre's goaltending performances, and by mid-January, had a 20–19–8 win–loss–tie record. The Flames won only five more games through the rest of the season, finishing at 25–38–15. Atlanta finished in seventh place in the West Division and missed the playoffs. The team was reasonably successful at the gate: it sold nearly 7,000 season tickets by the start of the season, and averaged 12,516 fans per game.

Tom Lysiak, selected second overall at the 1973 NHL Amateur Draft, joined the Flames for the 1973–74 season and made an immediate impact. Lysiak led the Flames in scoring with 64 points and finished second to the Islanders' Denis Potvin in voting for the Calder Memorial Trophy as the NHL's top rookie. Improving to 30–34–14, the Flames finished fourth in the West and qualified for the 1974 Stanley Cup playoffs. They made their post-season debut against the division-winning Philadelphia Flyers. The first game, played April 9, 1974, was a 4–1 victory for the Flyers. Philadelphia went on to defeat the Flames in their best-of-seven series with four consecutive wins. Geoffrion was praised for his coaching of the club and finished second in voting for the Jack Adams Award as top coach.

The NHL's expansion to 18 teams in 1974–75 resulted in realignment. The league moved to a four division format, placing the Flames in the Patrick Division. Lysiak repeated as the Flames' top scorer with 77 points while Eric Vail, playing his first full season, led with 39 goals. Vail's total led all rookies and earned him the Calder Trophy. The team overcame an eight-game losing streak in December and injuries to several key players to post their first winning season with a 34–31–15 record. However, they finished fourth in the Patrick Division and failed to qualify for the post-season. Citing personal reasons, Geoffrion resigned as head coach late in the season. He was replaced with Fred Creighton, who had been coaching the Flames' minor league affiliate, the Omaha Knights. Fletcher later credited Geoffrion's outgoing personality as being the primary reason why people in Atlanta followed the Flames in the franchise's first seasons while the team's players later stated an appreciation for Creighton's more technical coaching and teaching style.

1975–1980

Creighton produced a consistent, but not outstanding team, as the Flames finished third in the Patrick for the following three seasons and typically won a few games more than they lost each year. The team qualified for the playoffs all three years, but lost in the preliminary round each time. In 1975–76, they were defeated by the Los Angeles Kings in a best of three series, two games to none. The Kings again eliminated the Flames in 1976–77, but Atlanta earned its first playoff victory in franchise history in the second game of the series. Vail scored the game-winning goal in a 3–2 victory over the Kings on April 7, 1977, but the Flames were eliminated in the third game. 1975 draft pick Willi Plett emerged as a young star for the Flames. He scored 33 goals in his rookie season of 1976–77 and won the Calder Trophy.

Seeking to improve his team's fortunes, Fletcher made several moves over the following seasons to rework the Flames roster. His goaltending tandem of Bouchard and Myre had begun to feud with each other by the 1977–78 season as both sought more playing time. Fletcher responded by naming Bouchard his number one goaltender and trading Myre to the St. Louis Blues for three players. They made it into the playoffs again but were the only team to fall to a team with fewer points than them, the Detroit Red Wings, in a best-of-three series, two games to none. In March 1979, Fletcher completed an eight player trade that sent franchise-leading scorer Tom Lysiak and four players to the Chicago Black Hawks for three players, led by defenseman Phil Russell. Fletcher hoped the addition of Russell would help his team achieve playoff success.

Buoyed by a franchise record ten-game winning streak in October 1978, the 1978–79 Flames posted the best record in their Atlanta years at 41–31–8. Bob MacMillan, acquired in the Myre deal, became the first Flame other than Lysiak to lead the team in scoring in six years and, along with Guy Chouinard, was one of the first two Flames' players to score 100 points in one season. Chouinard also became the team's first 50-goal scorer. MacMillan won the Lady Byng Memorial Trophy that season as the NHL's most gentlemanly player. In the playoffs against the Toronto Maple Leafs, Atlanta again failed to win a game as they lost a best of three series two games to none.

Fletcher continued to alter his team's make-up throughout the 1979–80. Al MacNeil replaced Creighton as head coach prior to the season, and the team acquired Swedish star Kent Nilsson following the demise of the WHA. Nilsson led Atlanta in scoring with 40 goals and 53 assists. At the 1979 NHL Entry Draft, Fletcher selected four players – Paul Reinhart, Jim Peplinski, Pat Riggin and Tim Hunter – who would ultimately become regulars in the Flames line up. However, while the Flames again qualified for the playoffs in 1980, they again lost in the first round, losing a best-of-five series to the New York Rangers three games to one.

Relocation

As the team stagnated on the ice, the Flames struggled at the gate. They peaked at an average of 14,161 fans per game in their second season, 1973–74, but fell to 12,258 three years later and then 10,500 in 1977–78. Concerns that low attendance could result in the relocation of the team surfaced by 1976, prompting politicians and the players themselves to purchase tickets in a bid to stabilize the franchise. The Flames attempted to boost attendance in 1980 by signing Jim Craig, goaltender of the American Olympic team that had won the Olympic gold medal following its "Miracle on Ice" victory over the Soviet Union. It was not successful as attendance fell to an average of 10,024. Adding to the Flames' financial woes was the fact that the Omni Coliseum was one of the last major arenas in North America to be built without revenue-generating luxury suites, which led Fletcher to describe the facility as being "out-of-date when it opened".

Cousins announced he was seeking to sell the club following the Flames' exit from the playoffs; Their final game, a 5–2 loss against the New York Rangers, was played in Atlanta on April 12, 1980. He claimed to have suffered significant financial losses on the team while low viewership hampered his ability to sign a television contract. The Flames, estimated to have lost $12 million in its eight years, had been rumored for months to be moving to Calgary, though Dallas and Houston were also mentioned as possible destinations. Dallas got an NHL team in 1993, when the erstwhile Minnesota North Stars relocated to the city to become the Dallas Stars.

The Seaman brothers, Daryl and Byron, had made an offer of $14 million while the City of Calgary prepared to build a new arena for the team. However, Canadian businessman Nelson Skalbania emerged as a rival bidder for the team before joining the Calgary consortium. The group agreed to purchase the Flames for $16 million, at the time the highest price ever paid for an NHL franchise. The sale was announced on May 21, 1980, and the franchise relocated to Canada where it became the Calgary Flames. The Flames have since used the Atlanta logo for both its alternate captains, and the team's former affiliate that played in the American Hockey League (AHL), the Adirondack Flames.

The last active Atlanta Flames player in the NHL was Kent Nilsson, who played his final game in 1995. Several former players of the team returned to Atlanta once their careers ended. Among them, Tom Lysiak operated a horse farm outside the city, Eric Vail returned to operate a nightclub and Willi Plett operated a sporting theme park and golf course.

The NHL returns to Atlanta
The NHL returned to Atlanta in 1999, when the Atlanta Thrashers joined the league as an expansion franchise. The Flames and Thrashers were however in opposing conferences; this meant that the Flames, who were in the Western Conference, would play one game in Atlanta annually until the 2010–11 season, when the Thrashers announced that they were sold and relocating to Winnipeg, Manitoba, rebranding themselves as the second incarnation of the Winnipeg Jets (the first incarnation moved to Phoenix in 1996, and are now known as the Arizona Coyotes). With the Thrashers relocation to Winnipeg, Atlanta became the first city to have lost two NHL teams, in both cases, relocating to Western Canada.

Uniform
In their eight-year history, the Atlanta Flames wore red and white uniforms with yellow accents. This set generally had contrasting color stripes with yellow borders along the sleeves, socks and tail. A red shoulder stripe adorned the white uniforms. They carried this set over to Calgary following the relocation, replacing the "flaming A" with the "flaming C" decal in front. The "flaming A" was later used by the Calgary Flames to denote alternate captains.

Coincidentally, their then-sister team Atlanta Hawks also changed their colors to red and yellow shortly after the Flames were established. They would keep this color scheme until 2007, only to be restored in 2020. The Hawks also added black as a tertiary color in 1992, with the now-Calgary Flames following suit in 1995; as of 2022, both teams currently wear black uniforms as third jerseys while their primary uniforms dropped black from the color scheme.

Season-by-season record 

Note: GP = Games played, W = Wins, L = Losses, T = Ties, Pts = Points, GF = Goals for, GA = Goals against

Notable personnel

Team captains
 Keith McCreary 1972–1975
 Pat Quinn 1975–1977
 Tom Lysiak 1977–1979
 Jean Pronovost 1979–1980

Award winners
Three members of the Flames were named recipients of NHL awards during the team's tenure in Atlanta. Eric Vail was the first, as he won the Calder Memorial Trophy as the top rookie in 1974–75 after scoring 39 goals and finishing with 60 points. Paraguayan-born Willi Plett won the award two years later after scoring 33 goals and 23 assists in his first full NHL season. Bob MacMillan was named the league's most gentlemanly player in 1978–79, which earned him the Lady Byng Memorial Trophy. He finished fifth overall in league scoring with 104 points while accruing only 14 penalty minutes throughout the season.

Seven players represented the Flames at the NHL All-Star Game. Randy Manery became the team's first all-star when he played in the 1973 contest. He was subsequently joined by Al McDonough (1974), Tom Lysiak (1975, 1976 and 1977), Curt Bennett (1975 and 1976), Eric Vail (1977), Bill Clement (1978) and Kent Nilsson (1980).

Hockey Hall of Fame
There are three members of the Atlanta Flames organization to be enshrined in the Hockey Hall of Fame. Cliff Fletcher, a native of Montreal, began his career in hockey management as a scout for the Montreal Canadiens in 1956 and rose to the position of assistant general manager with the St. Louis Blues before being hired in 1972 as the inaugural and lone general manager of the Atlanta Flames. Fletcher remained with the organization for another 11 years following its transition to Calgary and was the architect of the franchise's lone Stanley Cup championship, in 1989. He was inducted into the Hockey Hall of Fame in 2004 as a builder.

Pat Quinn played with the Atlanta Flames from 1972 to 1977 was inducted as a builder for coaching various teams around the NHL. The Flames' first head coach, Bernie Geoffrion, was also inducted into the player category in 1972, the same year he joined the Flames organization.

No Flames alumnus has been inducted into the Players Category.

Broadcasters
All of the Flames' radio and television broadcasts were simulcasts. The Flames' games were televised over-the-air on WTCG 17 and on the radio by WSB (AM). Jiggs McDonald was the main play-by-play announcer with Skip Caray substituting from 1976–80. Color commentators included Andy Still (1972–73), Bob Neal (1973–74), Ed Thilenius (1974–75; home and televised games only), Bernie Geoffrion (1975–79), and Bobby Harper (1979–80; home games only). Pete Van Wieren also did play-by-play for the Flames.

Scoring leaders
These are the top ten scorers for the franchise during its time in Atlanta.

Note: GP = Games played, G = Goals, A = Assists, Pts = Points, PIM = Penalties in minutes

Individual records

Single-season
Most goals: Guy Chouinard, 50 (1978–79)
Most assists: Bob MacMillan, 71 (1978–79)
Most points: Bob MacMillan, 108 (1978–79)
Most penalty minutes: Willi Plett, 231 (1979–80)
Most points, defenseman: Paul Reinhart, 47 (1979–80)
Most points, rookie: Tom Lysiak, 64 (1973–74)
Most wins: Dan Bouchard, 32 (1978–79)

Career
 Games: Eric Vail, 469
 Goals: Eric Vail, 174
 Assists: Tom Lysiak, 276
 Points: Tom Lysiak, 431
 Penalty minutes: Willi Plett, 738
 Goaltender games: Dan Bouchard, 384
 Goaltender wins: Dan Bouchard, 164
 Shutouts: Dan Bouchard, 20

See also 

 Atlanta Thrashers

References 
Footnotes

General

 
1972 establishments in Georgia (U.S. state)
1980 disestablishments in Georgia (U.S. state)
Defunct National Hockey League teams
Ice hockey teams in Georgia (U.S. state)
Sports teams in Atlanta
Ice hockey clubs established in 1972
Sports clubs disestablished in 1980
Flames